Suphanburi Football Club Reserves and Academy are the Reserve team of Suphanburi F.C. They play in the Thai Premier League Reserves and Academy.

External links
 Official Website suphanburifootballclub
 Suphanburi FC Website

Football clubs in Thailand
Suphanburi
Sport in Suphan Buri province
Association football clubs established in 1998
1998 establishments in Thailand
Reserves and Academy